Charlie Gabriel (July 11, 1932) is a jazz musician who plays the saxophone, trumpet, clarinet, and flute. Gabriel has been a member of the Preservation Hall Jazz Band since 2006. He is the Preservation Hall Foundation's musical director. He has played in the Eureka Brass Band and in the bands of Lionel Hampton and Aretha Franklin. His first album released as a solo artist, 89, was released in 2022.

References 

1932 births
Jazz musicians
People from New Orleans
Preservation Hall Jazz Band members
Living people